Guy Muya (born 23 May 1983) is a Belgian-Congolese retired basketball player and current coach. He was the captain of the Belgian national basketball team and represented the team at two EuroBasket tournaments, in 2011 and 2013.

Professional career
Muya started his career in 2000 and played in Belgium, Italy and Spain. In June 2019, Muya retired as professional player and became team manager for Antwerp Giants.

Executive and coaching career 
After three seasons serving as sports manager of Antwerp Giants, he also became assistant coach of the team in 2022.

National team career
Muya played for the Belgium national basketball team and played with his country at the 2011 EuroBasket and 2013 EuroBasket.

References

External links
Belgian League profile
Euroleague profile

1983 births
Living people
BC Oostende players
Belfius Mons-Hainaut players
Belgian expatriate basketball people in Spain
Belgian men's basketball players
Brussels Basketball players
Democratic Republic of the Congo men's basketball players
Liège Basket players
RBC Pepinster players
Scafati Basket players
Shooting guards
Democratic Republic of the Congo emigrants to Belgium
Belgian expatriate basketball people in Italy
Belgian basketball coaches